Jules Olivier Ntcham (born 9 February 1996) is a professional footballer who plays as a midfielder for EFL Championship club Swansea City. Born in France, he plays for the Cameroon national team.

Ntcham was born in Longjumeau, a southern suburb of Paris, and played for numerous youth clubs in and around Paris before joining youth academies at Paris FC and Le Havre. In 2012, at the age of 16, Ntcham joined Manchester City's Elite Development Squad for £730,000. Developing under City's Football Development Executive Patrick Vieira, Ntcham's potential was noticed by club manager Manuel Pellegrini, who included him on City's pre-season tour of Australia in 2015.

After signing a professional contract with City, Ntcham was loaned out for a two season spell at Genoa in Italy's Serie A, with an option to buy later. In July 2017, Ntcham signed for Scottish Premiership side Celtic on a four-year permanent deal. He signed a contract extension with the Glasgow club in November 2018, extending his stay until 2022. In February 2021, Ntcham was loaned out to French club Marseille. Ntcham joined Swansea City in September 2021.

Internationally, Ntcham has represented France at numerous levels, most recently the France national under-21 football team at the 2019 UEFA European Under-21 Championship.

Club career

Manchester City
Ntcham signed for Manchester City in 2012, joining from French club Le Havre for a fee in the region of €1m, after refusing to sign a professional contract at the club. In July 2015, he signed a five-year deal with Manchester City, before joining Italian side Genoa on a two-year loan.

Loan to Genoa
On 28 August 2015, Serie A side Genoa signed Ntcham on a two-year loan with an option to buy. He made his debut for the club on 23 August 2015, in a 1–0 defeat to Palermo. His second match was marked with a 2–0 win against Hellas Verona.

Ntcham's first goal for Genoa came in the opening game of his second season, during a 3–1 win over Cagliari on 21 August 2016. He scored his second goal on 26 February 2017, in stoppage time, rescuing a 1–1 draw with Bologna.

Celtic
On 12 July 2017, Ntcham signed a four-year contract with Celtic. He scored his first goal for Celtic in a 1–0 win against Partick Thistle on 11 August 2017. On 9 November 2018, at the age of 22, he signed a new four-year contract to keep him at Celtic until the year 2022.

Ntcham scored the winning goal against Lazio in the Europa League on 7 November 2019, giving Celtic a historic 2–1 victory as their first ever win in Italy.

Loan to Marseille
On 1 February 2021, Ntcham joined French side Marseille on loan for the remainder of the 2020–21 season. Manager André Villas-Boas, who had informed the Marseille board that he didn't want the player, offered his resignation the following day in response to Ntcham joining and was suspended as manager a few hours later for publicly criticising the club's board. On 10 February 2021, he made his debut for Marseille as a substitute for Valentin Rongier in a 2–0 away win over AJ Auxerre in the Coupe de France. On 10 February 2021, he made his league debut as a substitute for Michaël Cuisance in a 0–0 away draw against Bordeaux.

Swansea City
On 1 September 2021, Ntcham joined Championship club Swansea City on a free transfer. He scored his first goal for Swansea in a 3–3 draw with Luton Town on 18 September 2021.

International career
Ntcham was born in France to parents of Cameroonian descent. He was a youth international for France at various levels.

In November 2019, he was placed on standby for Cameroon's Africa Cup of Nations qualifiers against Cape Verde and Rwanda. He debuted with the Cameroon national team in a friendly 2–0 loss to Uzbekistan on 23 September 2022.

Career statistics

Honours
Celtic
Scottish Premiership: 2017–18, 2018–19, 2019–20
Scottish Cup: 2017–18, 2018–19
Scottish League Cup: 2017–18, 2018–19, 2019–20

References

External links

 
 
 
 
 
 

1996 births
Living people
People from Longjumeau
Footballers from Essonne
Cameroonian footballers
Cameroon international footballers
French footballers
France youth international footballers
France under-21 international footballers
Association football midfielders
Manchester City F.C. players
Genoa C.F.C. players
Celtic F.C. players
Olympique de Marseille players
Serie A players
Scottish Professional Football League players
Ligue 1 players
2022 FIFA World Cup players
Cameroonian expatriate footballers
French expatriate footballers
Expatriate footballers in Wales
Expatriate footballers in England
Expatriate footballers in Italy
Expatriate footballers in Scotland
French expatriate sportspeople in Wales
French expatriate sportspeople in England
French expatriate sportspeople in Italy
French expatriate sportspeople in Scotland
Black French sportspeople
French sportspeople of Cameroonian descent
Swansea City A.F.C. players